Events in the year 1977 in Belgium.

Incumbents
Monarch: Baudouin
Prime Minister: Leo Tindemans

Events
 17 April – 1977 Belgian general election
 5 September – Athus Steelworks closes.
 11 October – Award of Nobel Prize in Chemistry to Ilya Prigogine announced

Births

Deaths
 30 January – Raoul Van Overstraeten (born 1885), general

References

 
1970s in Belgium
Belgium
Years of the 20th century in Belgium
Belgium